"Civil War" is a 2006–07 Marvel Comics crossover storyline consisting of a seven-issue limited series of the same name written by Mark Millar and penciled by Steve McNiven and various tie-in books. The storyline builds upon events in previous Marvel storylines, particularly "Avengers Disassembled", "House of M", and "Decimation". The series' tagline is "Whose Side Are You On?"

The plot begins when the U.S. government passes a Superhero Registration Act, ostensibly to have super-powered individuals act under official regulation, somewhat akin to law enforcement. Superheroes who oppose the act, led by Captain America, find themselves in conflict with its supporters, led by Iron Man. Spider-Man is caught in the middle, while the X-Men take a neutral stance. The superheroes who support the law, including Mister Fantastic and Ms. Marvel, become increasingly authoritarian. Civil War explores the conflict between freedom and security against a backdrop of real-life events and discussions, such as the U.S. government's increased surveillance of its citizens.

The series polarized critics and fans but it was a commercial success. A sequel, Civil War II, debuted in June 2016. The 2016 film Captain America: Civil War in the Marvel Cinematic Universe loosely adapted the storyline.

Publication history 
The Superhero Registration Act introduced in Civil War requires any person in the United States with superhuman abilities to register with the federal government as a "human weapon of mass destruction," reveal their true identity to the authorities, and undergo training. Those who register may work for S.H.I.E.L.D., earning a salary and benefits like other American civil servants.

Characters within the superhero community in the Marvel Universe split into two groups: one advocating the registration as a responsible obligation, and the other opposing the law on the grounds that it violates civil liberties and the protection that secret identities provide. While arguing with Iron Man about the law, Luke Cage (previously the second Power Man), an African American, compares the mandatory registration to slavery. A number of villains also choose one side or the other.

Mark Millar, writer for the story, has said:

Delays 
Marvel announced in August 2006 that some issues of the main Civil War series would be pushed back several months to accommodate artist Steve McNiven. The schedule had issue #4 being released one month late, in September, while issue #5 was released two months later, in November. Furthermore, various tie-in books including the Civil War: Front Line miniseries and tie-in issues of other comics were delayed several months so as not to reveal any plot developments.

In late November 2006, Marvel announced another delay. Civil War #6, originally scheduled for release on December 20, was pushed back two weeks and released on January 4. Unlike the previous instance, only The Punisher War Journal #2 was delayed. In a final act of rescheduling, Civil War #7 was pushed back two weeks (from January 17 to January 31), and then pushed back again until February 21.

Behind the scenes 
After the publication of Civil War #7, Mark Millar described the book to Newsarama as "a story where a guy wrapped in the American flag is in chains as the people swap freedom for security". Millar conceded a "certain amount of political allegory" but said its real focus was on superheroes fighting each other. Contrasting it with The Ultimates, Millar said Civil War was "accidentally political because I just cannot help myself."

Plot 
The New Warriors (Night Thrasher, Namorita, Speedball, and Microbe) battle a group of villains (Cobalt Man, Speedfreek, Coldheart, and Nitro) in Stamford, Connecticut, while filming a reality television show. Nitro explodes, killing more than 600 people (including school children and all of the New Warriors except Speedball). The rest of the superheroes appear in Stamford to search for survivors.

Public opinion turns against superhumans. Even the inactive members of the New Warriors are branded as "baby killers". Hindsight (desperate to distance himself from the team) releases their secret identities online, and several are attacked. She-Hulk forces Hindsight to shut down the site, and Hindsight is arrested by John Jameson. Angry civilians attack the Human Torch outside a club after he cuts the line and arrogantly delivers the quip, "Tell you what, gorgeous: next time you save the world from Galactus, you can borrow my free pass, 'kay?"

Guided by Iron Man, Congress quickly passes the Superhuman Registration Act (SHRA), 6 U.S.C. § 558, requiring the registration of all persons with superhuman abilities with the U.S. government, and the enlistment and training of those wishing to operate as superheroes. The law applies to those with naturally-occurring superhuman abilities, those humans using exotic technology (such as Iron Man), or anyone who wants to challenge the superhumans. Enactment of the federal law leads to revisions of state criminal codes.

Captain America refuses to join a S.H.I.E.L.D. strike force hunting superhumans in violation of the act, and is attacked by S.H.I.E.L.D.'s "Cape-Killers", even though the act has not been passed yet. Afterwards, he becomes a fugitive and forms an underground resistance movement calling itself the "Secret Avengers". This team includes Hercules, Falcon, Danny Rand (who is acting as Daredevil in Matt Murdock's place), Luke Cage, and the Young Avengers. Iron Man, Reed Richards, Hank Pym (actually a Skrull in disguise), and She-Hulk come down in favor of the act. Spider-Man unmasks at a press conference as a show of support for the act. Doctor Strange wants no part of the act and tells Iron Man and Mister Fantastic that they are never to call on him again (the government declares Doctor Strange exempt from the act).

The government-backed heroes track down unregistered superhumans and subsequently detain or register them. Captain America's Secret Avengers and Iron Man's Avengers end up fighting in Yancy Street. The Thing, who was only visiting the old neighborhood, gets roped into crowd control. However, when a young member of the Yancy Street Gang is killed in the violence that ensues, Grimm, disgusted with both sides, leaves the country for France.

The Secret Avengers, responding to a false emergency, are lured into an ambush by the pro-registration forces. As the battle turns against them, a new weapon is brought into play: Project Lightning, a cyborg clone of Thor (created from a few strands of the Asgardian's hair and empowered by a technological copy of Mjolnir). Confronted by Bill Foster, "Thor" sends a bolt of lightning through the hero's chest, killing him. With both sides in shock, Cap orders a retreat. Sue Storm shelters the re-grouping Secret Avengers under an energy shield, allowing their escape.

Bill Foster's death shakes up both sides: Stature and Nighthawk surrender and register, while the Human Torch and Invisible Woman oppose the act. In turn, Pym drafts a sub-group of the Thunderbolts to their cause.

Spider-Man demands to see the concentration camp-styled prison facilities "42" in the Negative Zone. He concludes that he has made a mistake by siding with Stark and attempts to defect from Iron Man's side but is confronted by Iron Man and, after a brief battle, escapes. Against Iron Man's will, he is hunted down and badly beaten by the Jester III and Jack O'Lantern of the new Thunderbolts. The Punisher saves Spider-Man by killing the two villains, and carries him to a Secret Avengers safe-house. After recovering from his injuries, Spider-Man joins Cap's forces, and makes a public statement in which he pledges to fight the Registration Act.

The Punisher seeks to join Captain America's forces, pointing out that Iron Man's decision to employ infamous mass murderers as enforcers of the act is what has motivated the vigilante to come out of hiding, although crime is at an all-time low as a result of the registered heroes. Captain America reluctantly accepts Punisher's offer of help.

As the Punisher makes his way through the Baxter Building to retrieve plans for the Negative Zone prison, Sue Richards travels to Atlantis to persuade Namor to join the Secret Avengers, although he refuses. The supervillains Goldbug and Plunderer arrive at the Secret Avengers' base to join Captain America's team, but the Punisher immediately kills them, leading Captain America to attack him and kick him out of the group.

While meditating, Doctor Strange speaks with Uatu the Watcher, who asks Strange why he doesn't use his immense power to end the conflict. Doctor Strange informs Uatu that the Sorcerer Supreme has no business in mankind's internal struggles, but promises to pray for an outcome that will benefit mankind and spill the least amount of blood.

As the final battle begins Cloak teleports the combatants to New York City, where Namor and an army of Atlanteans arrive to fight alongside the Secret Avengers, while the Champions, the Thor clone, and Captain Marvel reinforce Stark's team. Mister Fantastic saves Invisible Woman from a bullet launched by Taskmaster, and Hercules destroys the Thor clone. The Thing returns to protect the citizens from harm. As Captain America is about to deliver a final blow to Iron Man, policemen, EMTs, and firefighters try to restrain him. Realizing how much damage the fight has already inflicted upon the very people he wishes to protect, Captain America surrenders and orders his team to stand down.

Aftermath 
Following the Civil War, many changes have occurred in response to the events that transpired:

 The President of the United States grants general amnesty to all opponents of the Superhuman Registration Act who turn themselves in or register
Captain America, the main opponent to the act, is arrested and subsequently assassinated by a brainwashed Sharon Carter.
 Spider-Man's identity of Peter Parker is now known, causing J. Jonah Jameson to sue.
 An assassin hired by Kingpin misses Spider-Man, but strikes the "secondary target" of Aunt May, putting her in critical condition. An enraged Spider-Man dons a cloth version of his black suit and then confronts Kingpin in prison, mercilessly beating him within an inch of his life giving him a warning that if his aunt dies, Kingpin will as well and threatening the other inmates that he will come for them if they ever try to harm him or his family.  
 Tony Stark is appointed director of S.H.I.E.L.D. while Maria Hill is demoted to deputy director.
 The 50-State Initiative is set up to eventually place a superhero team in every state.
 The Mighty Avengers assemble as a new team.
 Some heroes choose to leave the country rather than submit. In Canada the third Omega Flight is gathered; Firestar retires; and several heroes remain underground, including the New Avengers: Luke Cage, Spider-Man, Spider-Woman (actually the Skrull Queen Veranke), Iron Fist, Doctor Strange, Ronin (actually a resurrected Clint Barton), Echo, and Wolverine.
 Goliath, Bantam, Typeface, and Stilt-Man have been killed during the conflict. Tom Foster continues his uncle's legacy, becoming the new Goliath.
 Mister Fantastic and Invisible Woman take a break from the Fantastic Four to work on their marriage and are replaced by Black Panther and Storm.
 Captain Marvel enters the present day.
 Speedball's powers (and sanity) are drastically altered, and he becomes the new Penance, a member of the Thunderbolts.
 A reconstituted version of the New Warriors emerges, bearing little resemblance to the original; most of the former Warriors are a part of The Initiative Program.
 Nova returns to Earth (after destroying Annihilus and thwarting its annihilation wave with the Nova Corps Worldmind in him). He finds out that his former teammates on the New Warriors are dead and has to decide whether or not to be on The Initiative as he battles the Thunderbolts. He chooses to leave Earth, heading for the Kree space.
 The real Thor Odinson was recently revived alongside other surviving Asgardian after Ragnarok and based New Asgard over Broxton, Oklahoma. Displeased that one of his friends who registered the unjust law betrayed those who opposed it, as well as secretly use his DNA to clone him, an angered Thor dispatches Iron Man and tells him to give the government who supported the act a merciless warning if they ever approach New Asgard uninvited again. Although he agrees with Stark's suggestion on keeping New Asgard as a separate location from United States, alongside its mission-related, and not to be bound by the currently active registration act, as long as the location remains hovering above the ground.
In an attempt to save his aunt May's life Spider-Man consults Doctor Strange for help only to be refused. He is then offered by Mephisto a difficult deal, save his aunt's life in exchange for his and Mary Jane "MJ" Watson's marriage to be erased from history as the demon sees their eventual daughter pose a threat to him in the future, both eventually agree to it after some deliberation and thus May's life is saved but Peter and MJ's marriage is erased and Spider-Man's secret identity is restored again.

Characters

"†" indicates that the character died during the storyline.

"∆" indicates that the character originally upheld the act, but defected and became a Secret Avenger.

"°" indicates that the character was a Secret Avenger, but defected and registered.

"+" indicates that the character either retired or relocated to Canada.

"×" indicates that the character was neutral, but later became a Secret Avenger.

Registered heroes and villains

 Black Widow
 Doc Samson
 Iron Man
 Mister Fantastic
 Ms. Marvel
 Phone Ranger
 She-Hulk
 Tigra
 Thor Clone
 Wasp
 Skrull Yellowjacket
 Wonder Man
 Bishop
 Micromax
 Sabra
 Penance
 Great Lakes Champions
 Sentry
 Hellcat
 Thor Girl
 Two-Gun Kid
 Arana
 John Jameson
 Stature°
 Nighthawk°
 S.H.I.E.L.D.
 Maria Hill
 Dum Dum Dugan
 Agent 13
 Agent Whitman
 Gabe Jones
 Cape-Killers
 Deadpool
 Blade
 Heroes for Hire
 Misty Knight
 Colleen Wing
 Humbug
 Shang-Chi
 Tarantula
 Black Cat
 Paladin
 Orka
 Thunderbolts
 Atlas
 Baron Helmut Zemo
 MACH-IV
 Moonstone
 Fixer
 Songbird
 Blizzard
 Radioactive Man
 Living Laser
 Noh-Varr

Detained and recruited heroes and villains / Thunderbolts army

See list of Thunderbolts members.

Unregistered heroes and villains / Secret Avengers

 Arachne∆
 Cable
 Luke Cage
 Captain America+
 Colossus×
 Cyclops×
 Havok×
 Diamondback
 Black Panther×
 Storm×
 Cloak
 Dagger
 Spider-Woman
 Daredevil
 Iron Fist
 Falcon
 Wolverine×
 Goliath†
 Nick Fury, Sr.
 Hercules
 Night Nurse
 Young Avengers
 Hulkling
 Wiccan
 Patriot
 Hawkeye
 Speed
 Vision
 Ultra Girl
 Triathlon
 Living Lightning
 Invisible Woman∆
 Human Torch∆
 Silhouette
 Firebird
 Machine Man
 Spider-Man∆
 Justice
 Stingray

Detained heroes and villains

 Battlestar
 Coldblood
 Jack Flag
 Ghost Rider
 Gladiatrix
 Lightbright
 N'Kantu, the Living Mummy
 Network
 Prodigy
 Prowler
 Shroud
 Solo
 Typeface
 Digitek
 Lectronn
 Silverclaw

Unregistered heroes
 Debrii
 Firestar+
 Jessica Jones+
 Magneto
 Quicksilver
 Rage
 Runaways
 Slapstick
 Thunderclap
 Timeslip
 Sersi
 Moon Knight
 Howard the Duck
 Winter Soldier

Neutral parties
 Doctor Strange
 Thing
 X-Men×
 Namor, the Sub-Mariner×
 Nova (Richard Rider)
 Thor

Other versions

Amazing Spider-Man: Renew Your Vows 
When the Super-Human Registration Act was proposed, Professor X and the Avengers argued that mutantkind and super-powered communities should police themselves. Cyclops thought it was preposterous for Professor X to appoint himself the representative of mutantkind, and his opposition to Xavier's proposal led Jean Grey to break up with him and marry Wolverine.

Contest of Champions 
The 2015 Contest of Champions series featured an alternate version of Civil War that had everything go in Tony Stark's favor. Five years after the war, Tony becomes the President of the United States and leads the Mighty Avengers as the Iron Patriot. His team consists of Penance (Robbie Baldwin), Iron Spider (Natasha Romanoff), Captain Marvel (Carol Danvers), and the Thor clone known as Thunderstrike. Steve Rogers (no longer called Captain America) and his teammates have been arrested and buy time off their sentence by performing suicide missions as the Thunderbolts. Steve's team consists of Spider-Man (Peter Parker), Invisible Woman, the Punisher, and Bill Foster's Goliath (who survived the Civil War in this reality).

President Stark and his Mighty Avengers are taken to Battleworld by Maestro and have their memories altered to think that they are on Earth and that the Renegade Champions already there are unregistered vigilantes. The Thunderbolts are sent to rescue them, but misunderstandings result in the deaths of Penance and Thunderstrike and all three teams start fighting each other. Tony kills Steve and reveals that he is in the possession of the Reality Gem from the Infinity Gauntlet.  Tony and the members of the Illuminati divided the six Infinity Stones after hunting them down and vowed never to use them. But when Tony let the events of Civil War happen in their natural course, he couldn't resist using the Reality Gem to alter events in his favor.  He used the gem to prevent the deaths of Goliath and Captain America, win the war, and rig the presidential election. He attempts to use it again to undo his killing of Steve, but it does not work since they were in another dimension. Maestro kills Tony and the Punisher, but is stopped by the intervention of Stick, the Sentry, and Nigel Higgins using the Iso-Sphere. The remaining five heroes from the Mighty Avengers and Thunderbolts stay behind on Battleworld with the Sentry and fight villains attempting to gather the Iso-Sphere as the Civil Warriors.

Earth-3490 
When Mister Fantastic was researching realities where the Civil War ended differently, he found one reality in which their version of Anthony Stark was a woman named Natasha Stark. The Civil War was avoided entirely in this reality due to her marriage to Steve Rogers, by deterring each other's more aggressive behaviour and allowing Reed Richards to complete the Super Hero Registration Program.

Spider-Man: Life Story 
In a reality where all the characters age naturally after Peter Parker becomes Spider-Man in 1962, the Superhuman Registration Act was passed shortly after the September 11 attacks in 2001 and lasted for years. As a result, most of the heroes are middle-aged and older. In 2006, Ben Reilly (who was publicly known as Peter Parker/Spider-Man) was murdered by Morlun, prompting the real Peter Parker to return to New York to reveal he's alive to draw Morlun out to him and prevent Stark from taking control of Parker Industries. When Peter refuses Stark's offer to register, he is attacked by the U.S. Avengers (consisting of Tony Stark/Iron Man, James Rhodes/War Machine, Carol Danvers/Captain Marvel, Natasha Romanoff/Black Widow, Jennifer Walters/She-Hulk, and Danny Rand/Iron Fist all wearing power armors) before he is assisted by the Anti-Registration Avengers (consisting of Steve Rogers/Captain America, Clint Barton/Hawkeye, Luke Cage, Tyrone Johnson/Cloak and Tandy Bowen/Dagger). Peter dons a new Spider-Man armor and defeats the U.S. Avengers with a device that exposes a fail-safe Tony placed inside all of their armors. After Tony is revealed to be a hologram and disappears, Spider-Man joins the Anti-Registration Avengers to follow his daughter's advice on leaving the world a better place for future generations. A decade later, it is revealed that Dr. Doom took over the planet as the heroes were too busy fighting each other (a reference to the 2015 Secret Wars). Peter becomes the new leader of the resistance after all the other heroes died or disappeared from the public.

Spider-Verse 
During an attempt by the reality-displaced Superior Spider-Man (Otto Octavius's mind in Peter Parker's body) to reach back to his dimension as seen in the Spider-Verse storyline, he discovered an alternate dimension where a Civil War Iron Spider-Man lies dead (killed by Karn) prompting him to continue investigating the murders of Spider-Men throughout the Multiverse.

What If? 
In What If Civil War Ended Differently?, a stranger appears in front of Iron Man, who is visiting Captain America's grave at Arlington National Cemetery. Tony Stark is told of two alternate ways the Civil War could have concluded:

 The first is detailed in, "What if Captain America led all the heroes against the Registration Act?" In this reality, Tony Stark dies of the Extremis virus, leaving the U.S. government to choose Steve Rogers as the spokesperson for heroes, who, as in the regular universe, opposes the Registration Act. Though he manages to delay its passing, the Stamford disaster occurs as in Earth-616. Without Tony to provide a fairer path for registration, the government's response is more extreme. Government forces led by Henry Peter Gyrich destroy the resistance and many heroes are slain.

Faced with this vision, Tony believes that this proves that he was right to pursue his pro-registration course of action, but the stranger then reveals another possibility;

 The second is detailed in, "What if Iron Man lost the Civil War?" In this reality, Iron Man asks for Cap's help during the confrontation at the power plant instead of threatening him, admitting his doubts about his actions rather than trying to justify them, and thus Cap does not use the hidden weapon in his glove to disable Tony's armor. The heroes then unite to defeat the out-of-control Thor clone, Ragnarok, which is released when a S.H.I.E.L.D. agent detects the weapon and assumes that Cap is still planning to use it. The resulting goodwill convinces Captain America to help run the program as he is the only one the heroes will trust with their secret identities.

The stranger is revealed to be Uatu, Earth 616's Watcher. Upon learning of the possibility of this alternate reality, Tony is devastated and weeps for the bright future he helped prevent.

In What If: Annihilation by David Hine and Mico Suayan, the cosmic Annihilation War reaches Earth during the War. The heroes unite to neutralize it, and many die in the first clashes. Captain America and Iron Man, after a final reconciliation, sacrifice themselves alongside Nova to deflect the full Annihilation Wave.

Civil War in Secret Wars (2015) 
The "Civil War" storyline is featured in the 2015 storyline "Secret Wars", a crossover storyline, which revisits previous Marvel Comics storylines in the form of isolated geographic locations on a planet called Battleworld. The "Civil War" area is referred to as the Warzone.

Civil War II (2016) 

A direct sequel to the original series debuted in June 2016, written by Brian Michael Bendis and drawn by David Marquez. Unlike the previous story and the film, the conflict in this storyline is not about issues of government registration; instead, a new Inhuman, Ulysses, emerges with the ability to see predictions about the future. This results in conflict emerging between heroes led by Iron Man and Captain Marvel respectively, Stark favoring self-determination and concerned about the prospects of coming to depend on the visions while Danvers feels that his visions represent a potentially valuable asset.

Reception 
At the time of its release, Civil War received mixed reviews. Comic Book Round Up gave the series an average rating of 6.5.
According to a scholarly analysis presented at the 2007 Comic-Con International, this story's conflict is a natural outgrowth of what psychologist Erich Fromm called "the basic human dilemma", the conflicting desires for both security and freedom, and "character motivations on both sides arise from positive human qualities because Fromm's image of human nature is ultimately optimistic, holding that people on either side are struggling to find what is best for all".
However, over time, Civil War has become more well received. IGN ranked it as one of the greatest Comic Book Events.

Tie-ins 
(This list is in read order)

Road to Civil War 
Amazing Spider-Man #529
Amazing Spider-Man #530
Amazing Spider-Man #531
New Avengers: Illuminati Special #1
Fantastic Four #536
Fantastic Four #537

Civil War 

Civil War: Opening Shot Sketchbook
Civil War #1
Wolverine #42
Wolverine #43
Wolverine #44
Wolverine #45
She-Hulk (2nd series) #8
X-Factor #8
New Avengers #21
New Avengers #22
Civil War: Front Line #1
Civil War #2
Amazing Spider-Man #532
Amazing Spider-Man #533
Thunderbolts #103
Civil War: Front Line #2
Fantastic Four #538
Fantastic Four #539
Amazing Spider-Man #534
Civil War: Young Avengers & Runaways #1
Civil War: Young Avengers & Runaways #2
Civil War: Young Avengers & Runaways #3
Civil War: Young Avengers & Runaways #4
Civil War: Front Line #3
Ms. Marvel #6
Ms. Marvel #7
Ms. Marvel #8
Thunderbolts #104
Thunderbolts #105
Civil War: War Crimes
Black Panther #18
Black Panther #19
Black Panther #20
Black Panther #21
Black Panther #22
Civil War: X-Men #1
Heroes for Hire #1
Civil War #3
Civil War #4
Civil War: X-Men #2
Civil War: X-Men #3
Civil War: X-Men #4
Black Panther #23
Iron Man Vol. 4 #13
Cable & Deadpool #30
Cable & Deadpool #31
Cable & Deadpool #32
Civil War: Front Line #4
X-Factor #9
Civil War: Front Line #5
Heroes for Hire #2
Heroes for Hire #3
New Avengers #23
Iron Man / Captain America: Casualties of War
Civil War Files
Wolverine #46
Wolverine #47
Captain America (5th series) #22
Captain America (5th series) #23
Captain America (5th series) #24
Civil War: Front Line #6
Civil War: Front Line #7
Daredevil #87
Civil War: Choosing Sides
New Avengers #24
Fantastic Four #540
Amazing Spider-Man #535
Civil War #5
Amazing Spider-Man #536
Punisher: War Journal #1
Punisher: War Journal #2
Punisher: War Journal #3
Iron Man #14
New Avengers #25
Black Panther #24
Civil War: Front Line #8
Fantastic Four #541
Fantastic Four #542
Amazing Spider-Man #537
Winter Soldier: Winter Kills
Blade #5
Civil War #6
Civil War: The Return
Civil War #7
Black Panther #25
Amazing Spider-Man #538
Civil War: The Confession
Civil War: The Initiative
Civil War: Battle Damage Report
Civil War Poster Book
Fallen Son: The Death of Captain America
Ghost Rider #8-11
Marvel Spotlight: Civil War Aftermath
Marvel Spotlight: Captain America Remembered

Related but not listed 
 The 2006 Eternals relaunch has the Civil War play a fairly present background in the setting with Sprite appearing in pro-registration PSAs. In issue #3, Iron Man reminds Sersi to register. In issue #6, Iron Man and Hank Pym try to get the Eternals to register again, but they refuse. In the end, Zuras explains that the Eternals have no desire to meddle with humanity, and will stay out of their affairs, which Iron Man concedes as a fair compromise.
 New X-Men #28 and She-Hulk #9 are indirectly, but strongly involved.
 Marvel Comics Presents (vol. 2) #12 involves a patsy attempt to get Man-Thing to register with the government.  The story was published late (October 2008 cover date), during Secret Invasion and the same month as Marvel Zombies 3, in which Man-Thing also appeared.
 The cover of Nextwave: Agents of H.A.T.E. #11 features a Civil War parody cover including a plaid background, the words "Not part of a Marvel Comics event," and Aaron Stack holding up a card reading "Mark Millar licks goats."
 Spider-Man and Power Pack #3 (March 2007) includes a parody entitled "Civil Wards," written by Marc Sumerak and illustrated by Chris Giarrusso.
 The final issue of Robert Kirkman's Marvel Team-Up opens with Peter Parker getting ready to travel to Washington with Iron Man.
 The third issue of the 2006 Union Jack miniseries also mentions Tony Stark and Peter Parker's trip to Washington.
 Incredible Hulk #100 includes a 12-page backup story dealing with Mr. Fantastic's involvement with the Thor clone, and the repercussions of the Illuminati having exiled the Hulk into space.
 In Annihilation #4, the former Earth hero Nova is aware of the Civil War and is disappointed with the actions the heroes have taken, as they are not united against the threat of Annihilus.
 In Friendly Neighborhood Spider-Man #6-13, Spider-Man is seen wearing the new suit he got in The Road to Civil War.
 Friendly Neighborhood Spider-Man #14-16
 New X-Men #29-31
 Thunderbolts #106-108
 In Sensational Spider-Man #26-27, Spider-Man is seen wearing the new suit he got in The Road to Civil War.
 In Sensational Spider-Man #28-34, Spider-Man deals with the aftermath of revealing his identity.
 Captain America (5th ed.) #25 is subtitled Civil War Epilogue.
 Fantastic Four #543 is subtitled Civil War Epilogue.
 Moon Knight (5th ed.) #8 and #9 are direct Civil War tie ins.
 Civil War: Front Lines #9-11 are direct Civil War tie ins.

Collected editions

Oversized hardcovers

Trade paperbacks

In other media

Novels 
Marvel adapted Civil War into a prose hardcover novel in July 2012 as the first of a series of four novels adapting some of Marvel's most significant fictional events.  It was written by Stuart Moore, the writer of Namor: The First Mutant. The book expanded on the story and set the events during Barack Obama's first term in office, rather than George W. Bush's last term; Tony Stark makes reference to the Affordable Care Act when speaking to Spider-Man in the first chapter of the novel. The novel is set in the alternate timeline created by the controversial storyline "One More Day" and detailed in "One Moment in Time", as Spider-Man is depicted as never having married Mary Jane Watson, having never arrived on the day of their wedding. In the original comics version, Civil War was a lead-in to "One More Day", depicting May Parker's assassination on the orders of Wilson Fisk near the end of the main Civil War storyline.

Film 

The 2016 film Captain America: Civil War was a cinematic treatment of the story, albeit focusing more on the issue of government control rather than public knowledge of secret identities: these matters were also being escalated by the interference and manipulation of Helmut Zemo as his plan for revenge against the Avengers' role in Ultron's assault and the deaths of Zemo's family. The movie version of Civil War also differs from the comic substantially, former U.S Army General Thaddeus Ross as the U.S Secretary of State is involved in the registration debacle instead of S.H.I.E.L.D and Maria Hill as the former was dismantled in Captain America: The Winter Soldier and the latter's whereabouts are unknown at that point or is presumably in hiding with Nick Fury, with the fate of Bucky Barnes becoming a key element of the war after he is framed for the assassination of the Black Panther's father, the king of Wakanda. As in the comics, Captain America and Iron Man are the respective leaders of the anti-registration and pro-registration sides of the conflicts, with Cap's side including the Falcon, Bucky, Ant-Man, Hawkeye, and the Scarlet Witch, and Iron Man's side being Black Widow, War Machine, the Black Panther, Spider-Man and the Vision. Stark and Rogers reconcile after realizing the truth of the king's assassination, but it is short lived as Zemo reveals Barnes' role in Stark's parents' deaths, and that Rogers kept the truth from him. An enraged Stark attacks both Rogers and Barnes, and the fight culminates with Rogers abandoning his shield and identity and escaping with Barnes, becoming a fugitive in the process. The film concludes with Cap's side seeking asylum in Wakanda after the Black Panther recognizes that he was wrong to target Bucky. The latter is then put in a cryogenetic sleep. Black Widow goes on the run after betraying Stark's side to help Rogers find the instigator of their fight, and War Machine is left crippled after injuries sustained in the final battle.

Later in the 2018 film Avengers: Infinity War it was revealed that Hawkeye and Ant-Man made deals with Ross to be placed in house arrest, so they could be with their families. The impact of the Civil War is also heavily felt throughout the film as the Avengers' disunity and Rogers and Stark still being on bad terms, left them vulnerable to Thanos' invasion and the Blip.

Television 
A different variation of the Civil War storyline closely resembling Civil War II as it features Iron Man and Captain Marvel in opposition to each other was adapted in the four-part Season finale of Avengers: Ultron Revolution. In this version of the storyline, the Registration Act targets new Inhumans, and teams of Avengers come into conflict over the issue, as in other adaptations. It is revealed in Part 3, however, that the Inhuman Registration Act is actually part of a plan by Ultron (disguised as Truman Marsh) to begin the Ultron Revolution by manipulating humans and Inhumans into destroying each other, which is foiled by the combined efforts of the Avengers.

Video games 
 The comic is adapted into Marvel: Ultimate Alliance 2. While the storyline remains relatively faithful to the original comic, it takes a different path halfway through the game, as the act is briefly suspended for the heroes to deal with a crisis involving the nanite network used to control supervillains manifesting a form of sentience. In the game, the player gets to choose whether to side with Pro or Anti-Registration- with Captain America, Luke Cage and Iron Fist 'locked' into Anti-Registration and Iron Man, Mister Fantastic and Songbird in Pro-Registration- which affects the story's progression, characters they interact with, and the story's ending. Spider-Man and Wolverine are however playable on both sides. 
 In Marvel vs. Capcom 3: Fate of Two Worlds, Iron Man and Captain America reference the event if they are pitted against each other. The player also receives an achievement titled "Whose Side are You On?" if Iron Man defeats Captain America or vice versa in an online match.
 In Marvel: Contest of Champions, a special storyline featured elements of the Civil War, as the apparent death of the Collector causes Iron Man and Captain America to become divided over what action they should take with the Iso-Spheres that must be collected in the game. This storyline also introduces a special player in the form of the Civil Warrior, who is identified as a version of Steve Rogers who witnessed so much death in the final battle of the Civil War that he adopted some of Tony Stark's armor and dedicated himself to preventing such a catastrophe ever again.

References

External links 

 
 Civil War Covers
 Civil War Review | BGN  Favourable review of Civil War

Captain America storylines
Comics set in New York City
Fictional wars
Harvey Award winners for Best Single Issue or Story
Iron Man storylines
Spider-Man storylines
Marvel Comics adapted into films
2007 comics endings